Theta Sagittae (θ Sagittae) is a double star in the northern constellation of Sagitta. With a combined apparent visual magnitude of +6, it is near the limit of stars that can be seen with the naked eye. According to the Bortle scale the star is visible in dark suburban/rural skies.

The primary, component A, is an F-type main sequence star with a stellar classification of F3V. This star is about two billion years old with 52% more mass than the Sun. It forms a double star with a magnitude 8.85 companion, which is located at an angular separation of  along a position angle of 331.1°, as of 2011. This is an unrelated giant star much further away than the close pair.

References

F-type main-sequence stars
Sagittae, Theta
Sagitta (constellation)
Durchmusterung objects
Sagittae, 17
191570
099351/2
7705
G-type main-sequence stars